Lothar Zenetti (6 February 1926 – 24 February 2019) was a German Catholic theologian, priest, and author of books and poetry. In Frankfurt, he was both a minister for young people and a parish priest. He was also active on radio and television. His songs, for example the popular "Das Weizenkorn muss sterben" and "Segne dieses Kind", appear in both Protestant and Catholic hymnals.

Life and work 

Zenetti was born in Frankfurt am Main. From 1931 he attended the Bonifatius-Schule, and the Goethe-Gymnasium beginning in 1936. He began national service in 1943, first with the Luftwaffenhelfer, then with the Reichsarbeitsdienst. At the end of the War, he was a prisoner of war, first of the Americans, then the French. During this time he began to study theology at the so-called  (barbed-wire seminary) of Chartres.

Back in Frankfurt, Zenetti completed his Abitur and studied at the Sankt Georgen Graduate School of Philosophy and Theology. He graduated in 1952 and was ordained a priest on 28 September 1952 by Wilhelm Kempf in Limburg an der Lahn. He worked as a Kaplan (vicar) in Oberbrechen, Kölbingen, Königstein im Taunus and at St. Bonifatius in Wiesbaden. In 1962 he became Stadtjugendpfarrer (minister for young people) in Frankfurt. He was a parish priest in St. Wendel in Frankfurt-Sachsenhausen from 1962 to 1995.

Zenetti published several books and many poems. His song "Das Weizenkorn muss sterben" (The wheat kernel must die), part of Catholic and Protestant hymnals, is popular. About 150 of his poems were set to music in the genre Neues Geistliches Lied (NGL), several were included in hymnals, others appeared in song collections and were recorded, like the ballad "" by the singer-songwriter (Liedermacher) Konstantin Wecker. He translated hymns by the Dutch priest and lyricist Huub Oosterhuis into German, such as "Ik sta voor U in leegte en gemis" to "Ich steh vor dir mit leeren Händen, Herr" which is part of both Gotteslob and Evangelisches Gesangbuch. He also wrote texts and songs in the Mundart (dialect). Zenetti worked on the public television series , and was the representative of the Catholic Church for the broadcaster Hessischer Rundfunk.

In 1984 Zenetti was awarded the prize Humor in der Kirche (Humour in the church) by the Diocese of Limburg. He died in Frankfurt on 24 February 2019 at the age of 93.

Works 
Forty-eight publications by Zenetti are listed by the German National Library (DNB).

Books 
 Nägel mit Köpfen. Handreichungen für das Glaubensgespräch, 1960
 Gottes frohe Kinderschar. Werkbuch für kirchliche Kinderarbeit, 1961
 Kinderwelt und Gotteswort. Hundert Kinderansprachen, 1962
 Morgens, mittwochs und abends.. Werkbuch für Mädchengruppe und -freizeit, 1963
 Peitsche und Psalm.Spirituals und Gospelsongs. Geschichte und Glaube der Neger Nordamerikas, 1963
 Initiativen. Junge Christen in einer großen Stadt. Reportagen, 1964
 Heiße (W)Eisen in der Kirche. Jazz, Beat, Songs, Schlager in der Kirche?, 1966
 Zeitansage. Werkbuch zum Gottesdienst einer neuen Generation, 1969
 Texte der Zuversicht. Für den einzelnen und die Gemeinde, 1972
 Sieben Farben hat das Licht, 1975
 Gästebuch des lieben Gottes. Gemeinde zwischen Wunsch und Wirklichkeit, 1975
 Das allerschönste Fest. Ein Frankfurter Weihnachtsbuch, 1977
 Die wunderbare Zeitvermehrung. Variationen zum Evangelium, 1979
 ’s Frankforder Christkindche. Zwei Krippenspiele in Frankfurter Mundart, 1981
 Manchmal leben wir schon. Wege, die der Glaube geht. Rundfunk-Ansprachen, 1981, 2002
 Die Stunde der Seiltänzer. Geschichten und Gedichte, 1982
 Wunder geschehen nicht nur sonntags. Erfahrungen mit dem Alltag, Rundfunkansprachen, 1984
 Meine Zeit in guten Händen. Mit alten Bildern, Bräuchen und Gebeten durch das Jahr, 1985
 Das Jesuskind. Verehrung, Darstellung, Kunst und Frömmigkeit , 1987
 Wir sind noch zu retten. Neue Texte der Zuversicht, 1989
 Auf Seiner Spur. Texte gläubiger Zuversicht, Topos Taschenbücher Bd. 327, 2000
 In Seiner Nähe, 2002

Songs 
Some of Zenetti's songs have been included in hymnals, such as Evangelisches Gesangbuch (EG) and the Catholic Gotteslob.
 "Das eine Brot wächst auf vielen Halmen" (GL 728, Limburg) 
 "Das Kreuz des Jesus Christus", music by Peter Janssens and 
 "Das Lied von der Veränderung der Welt", music by Christoph Enzinger
 "Der am Kreuz ist meine Liebe", after Klopstock (GL 774, Limburg) 
 "Das Weizenkorn muss sterben", 1971, music by Johann Lauermann (EG 585, GL 620, formerly 218)
 "Einer ist unser Leben", 1973, tune by Jeas Liesse (GL 798, Limburg)
 "Segne dieses Kind und hilf uns, ihm zu helfen", 1971
 music by Erna Woll, 1971 (former GL 636)
 music by Michael Schütz, 1983 (EG 581, GL 490)
 "Herr, segne uns", 1971, tune by Karl Fink (GL 848, former GL 919, Limburg)
 "Seht, das Brot, das wir teilen", 1972, tune: Rolf Schweizer 1983, (EG 226)
 "Seht, der Stein ist weggerückt"
 music by Karl Fink, 1975 (former GL 836 in Limburg)
 music by Josef Oestemer, 2011 (GL 783 in Limburg)
 "Seht, er lebt", 1973, tune: from Israel, (GL 781 Limburg)
 "Stille lass mich finden", music by Peter Reulein 1999
 "Was keiner wagt", music by Konstantin Wecker
 "Weder Tod noch Leben", 1972, music by Bertold Hummel 1976
 "Wie ein Traum wird es sein", music by 
 "Wir alle essen von einem Brot", 1969, music by Ingrid Hirschfeldt 1969 (former GL 539)
 "Wir sind mitten im Leben", 1970, music by Herbert Beuerle (former GL 655)
 "Wir sprechen verschiedene Sprachen", music by Winfried Heurich
 "Worauf sollen wir hören", 1971, music by Peter Kempin (former GL 623)
 translation of "Ik sta voor U in leegte en gemis" by Huub Oosterhuis: "Ich steh vor dir mit leeren Händen, Herr", 1974, (EG 382, GL 422/621)

References

External links 
 Lyrische Texte von Lothar Zenetti, zusammengestellt von Christoph Fleischer, Werl 2010 Der schwache Glaube, 2010
 Ein Priesterdichter wird 90 Diocese of Limburg

20th-century German Roman Catholic priests
Christian hymnwriters
20th-century German writers
1926 births
2019 deaths
Clergy from Frankfurt
Sankt Georgen Graduate School of Philosophy and Theology alumni
Luftwaffenhelfer
German prisoners of war in World War II held by France
German prisoners of war in World War II held by the United States
Reich Labour Service members